A Metro line is a line of a rapid transit system

Metro Line, Metro line, or Metroline may also refer to:

Metro Line, a specific line of the Edmonton, Alberta, Canada LRT system
Metroline, a London bus operator
Metro Line M1-M5, multiple lines of the Budapest Metro
Metro x Line, multiple lines of the Metro Transit (Minnesota) system

See also

 Metroliner (disambiguation)
 Metrolina (disambiguation)
 
 
 Metro (disambiguation)
 Line (disambiguation)